Joey may refer to:

People 
Joey (name)

Animals 
 Joey (marsupial), an infant marsupial
 Joey, a Blue-fronted Amazon parrot who was one of the Blue Peter pets

Film and television
 Joey (1977 film), an American film directed by Horace Jackson
Joey (1985 film), a German horror film directed by Roland Emmerich
Joey (1986 film), an American film directed by Joseph Ellison
Joey (1997 film), an Australian film directed by Ian Barry
Joey (TV series), a spin-off of the popular Friends television series

Music
 Joey (album), 2014 album by Danish singer Joey Moe
 "Joey" (Bob Dylan song), from the 1976 album Desire
 "Joey" (Concrete Blonde song), a song by Concrete Blonde from their 1990 album Bloodletting
 "Joey" (Sugarland song), by Sugarland from their 2008 album Love on the Inside
 "Joey", a 1954 song by Betty Madigan
 "Joey", a song by Bon Jovi from their 2002 album Bounce

Sports
 Joey, a type of return in pickleball
 Australia national under-17 football team, nicknamed The Joeys

Other uses
 Nickname of a Britten-Norman Trislander aircraft (registration G-JOEY) - see Aurigny
 JOEY-DTV, callsign for Ehime Asahi Television
 JOEY, a Western Canadian restaurant chain
 Joey, a name for Continental Rummy
 Joey's Seafood Restaurants, a chain in Canada
 Nickname of the British predecimal threepence coin

See also